Gamma Theta Upsilon ( or GTU) is an international honor society in geography.

History
On May 15, 1928, a local professional fraternity by the name of Gamma Theta Upsilon was formed at Illinois State University under the guidance of Dr. R. G. Buzzard. Before that it was the Geography Club at Illinois State Normal University. After three years letters were sent out to other geography clubs suggesting the formation of a national fraternity.

On May 15, 1931, the organization, consisting of four chapters, was announced. On March 5, 1936, Gamma Theta Upsilon was incorporated, then with ten chapters, as a professional fraternity in geography under the laws of Illinois.

Gamma Theta Upsilon became an International Honorary Geographical Society in January 1969. The organization is a college honor society, and has been a member of the Association of College Honor Societies since 1976.

Badge
The badge of Gamma Theta Upsilon is a key, significant of achievement of quality in a field of science. The symbolism of the key is as follows:

The base or body of the key is a seven sided shield, the bevel of which carries on each side the initial of one of the great land masses of the earth. Beginning with Europe at the top, to the right is Asia, Africa and Australia, the great land masses of the Old or Eastern World. To the left on the key is North America, South America, and Antarctica, the three great land masses brought into geographical knowledge as man expanded westward from Europe, the so-called New World.

Spread across the base of the key are five wavy blue lines, significant of the five great bodies of water which have carried man out from Europe to the lands of the earth, -the Atlantic Ocean, the Indian Ocean, the Pacific Ocean, the Arctic Ocean, and the Antarctic Ocean or Great Southern Ocean.

Above the waves significant of the oceans is placed a white star, symbolic of Polaris, the great guide to man as he pushed out from Europe over the uncharted vastness of the ocean.

At the top of the key the Greek-letters, Gamma, Theta, and Upsilon, the initials of the three Greek words, (Ge), (Thalatta), and (Hypaithrios), meaning earth, sea, and atmosphere-placed there to remind you of the three great environmental domains with which geography deals.

The purposes of GTU
To further professional interest in geography by affording a common organization for those interested in this field.

To strengthen student and professional training through academic experiences other than those of the classroom and laboratory.

To advance the status of geography as a cultural and practical discipline for study and investigation.

To encourage student research of high quality and to promote an outlet for publication.
To create and administer funds for furthering graduate study and/or research in the field of geography.

Chapters and Membership
Local Chapters are chartered by Gamma Theta Upsilon at colleges and universities. A petition for a new chapter must be submitted by the faculty member who will serve as chapter sponsor or by the department chair and a letter of support from the department chair (if not the petitioner) or an appropriate administrator is required. As of December 2012, there are 163 active chapters.

Once a chapter has been established, members can be initiated into the society.  Initiates must have completed a minimum of 3 geography courses, must have a GPA of at least 3.3 overall and in geography, and must have completed at least 3 semesters or 5 quarters of college course work.

Scholarships
Five scholarships (four for undergraduates and one for a graduate student) are awarded on an annual basis. In evaluating scholarship applications, consideration is given to cumulative GPA, geography GPA, letters of recommendation, the applicant's contribution to local GTU chapter and the department, as well as the applicant's own appraisal of how the scholarship will help him or her personally and professionally. The Scholarships are:
 The Buzzard Undergraduate Scholarship
 The Maxfield Undergraduate Scholarship
 The Rechlin Undergraduate Scholarship
 The Richason Undergraduate Scholarship
 The Buzzard Graduate Scholarship.
Previous recipients of the Scholarships can be found at http://www.gammathetaupsilon.org/scholarships-awarded.html.

Geographical Bulletin

The Geographical Bulletinis a peer-reviewed scholarly journal published twice a year by GTU. Articles concerning any area of geographical interest are solicited from students and faculty. Initiates receive two free issues after initiation and may subsequently renew their subscription.

Visiting Geographical Scientist Program (VGSP)
The Visiting Geographical Scientist Program, funded by GTU and administered by the Association of American Geographers (AAG), provides an opportunity for chapters to host a distinguished geographer on their campus. The visiting geographer will give a lecture on a topic in geography and meet with faculty, students and administrators.

References

External links
Gamma Theta Upsilon, The International Geographical Honor Society
  ACHS Gamma Theta Upsilon entry
  Gamma Theta Upsilon chapter list at ACHS

Association of College Honor Societies
Geographic societies
Student organizations established in 1931
1931 establishments in Illinois